Tobi! is an American short-form children's television series originally airing on Treehouse TV in Canada, and Nickelodeon in Australia. The series premiered on March 7, 2010.

Plot
A young boy named Tobi wishes to make his world a better place.

Episodes
Only four episodes were produced. A list of them is available below.

List
The Beach
The Wall
No Place Like Home
Tobi and the Bonkle

Broadcast
The series premiered on March 7, 2010, on Treehouse TV in Canada and Nickelodeon in Australia. The series would later be broadcast on various international networks.

Networks
  Australia: Nickelodeon
 Canada: Treehouse TV
 Denmark: Danish Broadcasting Corporation
 Finland: Finnish Broadcasting Company
 Iceland: RÚV
 Iran: IRIB
 Malaysia: TV Alhijrah
 Norway: NRK
 Sweden: Sveriges Television
 United States: Discovery Education

External links
 Official site

References

English-language television shows
Nickelodeon (Australia and New Zealand) original programming
2010s American children's television series
American preschool education television series
2010s preschool education television series
2010 American television series debuts
2010 American television series endings
Nick Jr. original programming
Treehouse TV original programming
Television series about children